Hillia may refer to:
 Hillia (moth), a genus in the tribe Xylenini
 Hillia (plant), a genus in the family Rubiaceae